Brighton East is a suburb in Melbourne, Victoria, Australia, 12 km south-east of Melbourne's Central Business District, located within the Cities of Bayside and Glen Eira local government areas.

Brighton East lies further inland from the coast of Port Philip Bay than Brighton, its affluent, neighbouring community to the west. Its boundaries are Nepean Highway in the northwest, North Road in the north, Thomas Street in the east, Nepean Highway in the southeast, South Road in the south, and Hampton Street in the west. Whilst most of Brighton East is located within the City of Bayside, a number of properties on Thomas Street are located within the City of Glen Eira.

Brighton East is known for its spacious parklands, most notably Dendy Park, one of Victoria's 10 biggest parks and outdoor recreation areas, Hurlingham Park, and Landcox Park.

History

A massacre of at least 60 Bunurong people is believed to have taken place on the site of present-day Hurlingham Park and Landcox Park in the early 1830s, at a place known as Warrowen (various spellings, meaning "place of sorrow" or "incessant weeping"). It was "well known to early settlers, is mentioned in histories of Brighton, and pioneers' accounts – it was commonplace information in early Melbourne history".

Educational institutions

Brighton East is home to St. Finbar's Primary School (Catholic), Brighton Secondary College, Haileybury College, Gardenvale Primary School and St Leonard's College.  Near Brighton East is Bentleigh West Primary School.

Sport

East Brighton United Football Club (senior Football Federation Victoria club known locally as "The Vampires"), Brighton Soccer Club (the largest Soccer Club in Victoria) and Brighton District Cricket Club are based at Dendy Park. East Brighton Vampires Football Club, competing in the Moorabbin Saints Football League and Brighton Union Cricket Club, competing in the South East Cricket Association, are based at Hurlingham Park. Brighton Bowls Club is situated on the northeastern boundary of Dendy Park.

See also
 City of Brighton – Brighton East was previously within this former local government area.

References

External links
Bayside City Council Website
Brighton Soccer Club (Vic) Inc
East Brighton United Football Club Website

Suburbs of Melbourne
Suburbs of the City of Bayside
Suburbs of the City of Glen Eira